The Slovak Figure Skating Championships are the figure skating national championships held annually to crown the national champions of Slovakia. Medals may be awarded in the disciplines of men's singles, ladies' singles, pair skating, and ice dancing on the senior, junior, and novice levels. Prior to 1994, during the existence of Czechoslovakia, the championships were held at the sub-national level.

In the 2006–07 and 2007–08 seasons, the Slovak and Czech associations held their national championships together in one event. The Three Nationals Championships were formed when Poland joined in the 2008–09 season. Following the addition of Hungary in the 2013–14 season, the event is known as the Four Nationals Championships. Skaters from the four countries compete together and the results are split at the end of the competition to form national podiums.

Senior medalists

Men

Ladies

Pairs

Ice dancing

Junior medalists

Men

Ladies

References

External links
 Slovak Figure Skating Association 

 
Figure skating in Slovakia
Figure skating national championships